Albert Burtch, Sr., (September 20, 1804March 8, 1888) was an American farmer and Wisconsin pioneer. He served one term in the Wisconsin State Assembly, representing Dodge County.

Biography
Albert Burtch was born in Herkimer County, New York, in 1804.  He was raised and educated in New York state and came west to the Wisconsin Territory with his family in October 1845. He settled near what would later become the village of Mayville, Wisconsin, and claimed 320 acres of mostly timber land.

He became involved in local affairs and was elected as a village trustee and chairman of the town board.  He was elected on the Democratic Party ticket to the Wisconsin State Assembly in 1862 and served in the 16th Wisconsin Legislature.  He died on his farm near Mayville in 1888.

Personal life and family
Burtch was married twice and was the father of at least nine children.

His first wife, Eliza Streeter, died in 1864. He married Zillah Fidelia Barney ( Goodwin) in 1866. Zillah was the widow of Benjamin Barney, and from her first marriage had several children. One of those children was John A. Barney, who would later serve in the Wisconsin State Senate and Assembly, and served in the Union Army in the American Civil War—losing an arm at the Battle of Chickamauga.

Burtch's son Henry S. Burtch was also a member of the Wisconsin State Assembly, serving during the 1870 session.  He also served in Company E of the 1st Wisconsin Cavalry Regiment during the Civil War and was wounded at the Battle of Nashville.

His son Gideon served in Company E of the 3rd Wisconsin Infantry Regiment during the Civil War.

References

External links
 

1804 births
1888 deaths
People from LeRoy, Wisconsin
Businesspeople from Wisconsin
19th-century American politicians
People from Addison, Wisconsin
19th-century American businesspeople
Democratic Party members of the Wisconsin State Assembly